
The Vadathika Cave Inscription, also called the Nagarjuni Hill Cave Inscription of Anantavarman, is a 5th- or 6th-century CE Sanskrit inscriptions in Gupta script found in the Nagarjuni hill cave of the Barabar Caves group in Gaya district Bihar. The inscription is notable for including symbol for Om in Gupta era. It marks the dedication of the cave to a statue of Bhutapati (Shiva) and Devi (Parvati). The statue was likely of Ardhanarishvara that was missing when the caves came to the attention of archaeologists in the 18th-century.

History
The Vadathika Cave, also called Vadathi ka Kubha is one of three caves found in the Nagarjuni Hill cluster near the Barabar Caves in Bihar. The other two are Vapiyaka Cave and Gopika Cave, also called Vapiya ka Kubha and Gopi ka Kubha respectively. These are near the Lomas Rishi Cave, the earliest known cave excavated in 3rd century BCE and gifted by Ashoka to the Ajivikas monks. The Nagarjuni Caves were excavated in 214 BCE from a granite hill by the grandson of Ashoka.

According to Arthur Basham, the motifs carved in these groups of caves as well as inscriptions help establish that the Nagarjuni and Barabar Hill caves are from the 3rd century BCE. The original inhabitants of these were the Ajivikas, a non-Buddhist Indian religion that later became extinct. They abandoned the caves at some point. Then the Buddhists used these caves because there are the Bodhimula and Klesa-kantara inscriptions found here. Centuries later, a Hindu king named Anantavarman, of Maukhari dynasty, dedicated Hindu murti (images) of Vaishnavism, Shaivism and Shaktism in three of these caves in the 5th or 6th century. To mark the consecration, he left inscriptions in Sanskrit. These inscriptions are in then prevalent Gupta script and these have survived. After the 14th-century, the area was occupied by Muslims, as a number of tombs are nearby.

The Vadathika Cave inscription was first noticed in 1785 by J. H. Harrington, then reported to scholars in the 1790 issue of Asiatic Researches, Volume 2. It is found on the northern side of the hill, immediately next to the Vapiyaka Cave and its Vapi (water tank). The cave has several inscriptions, including one from the 3rd-century BCE. It starts by stating the name of the cave to be Vadathi, the source of this cave's historic name and the inscription. The inscription as copied by Harrington was first translated by Charles Wilkins. In 1847, Markham Kittoe made a new eye-copy and published it with Rajendralal Mitra's new translation. John Fleet published another revised translation in 1888.

Description
It is one of the earliest Indian inscriptions that uses full matras (horizontal bar above each letter).

Inscription, edited by Fleet

1. Om āsīt sarvvamahīkṣitā manur iva kṣattrasthiter ddeśikaḥ_śrīmān mattagajendrakhelagamanaḥ śrīyajñavarmmā nṛpaḥ |
2. yasyāhūtasahasranettravirahakṣāmā sadaivādhvaraiḥ_paulomī ciram aśrupātamalināṃ dhatte kapolaśriyaṃ ||

3. śrīśārdūlanṛpātmajaḥ parahitaḥ śrīpauruṣaḥ śrūyate|loke candramarīcinirmmalaguṇo yo nantavarmmābhidhaḥ |
4. dṛṣṭādṛṣṭavibhūti kartṛvaradaṃ tenādbhutaṃ kāritaṃ|vimvaṃ bhūtapater guhāśritam idaṃ devyāś ca pāyāj jagaT ||

5. ansāntākṛṣṭaśārṅgapravitatasaśarajyāsphuranmaṇḍalānta_vyaktabhrūbhaṅgalakṣmavyatikaraśavalākhaṇḍavaktrenduvimva |
6. antāyānantavarmmā smarasadṛśavapur jjīvite nispṛhābhiḥ_dṛṣṭa sthitvā mṛgībhiḥ suciram animiśasnigdhamugdhekṣaṇābhi ||

7. atyākṛṣṭāt kuraravirutasparddhinaḥ śārṅgayantrā_2_dvegāviddhaḥ pravitataguṇād īritaḥ sauṣṭhavena |
8. dūraprāpī vimathitagajodbhrāntavājī pravīro_2_vāṇo ristrīvyasanapadavīdeśiko nantanāmna ||
– Vadathika Cave Inscription

Translation by Fleet
John Fleet translated it as,

Significance
The inscription is a Shaiva inscription, one that mentions one statue (vimvaṃ, bimba) depicting Shiva and Parvati, which states Fleet likely means it was an Ardhanarishvara image, with one half as male Shiva and the other half as female Parvati. The inscription starts with Om, just prior to the first line, signifying its importance in 5th-century Hindu theology.

Markham Kittoe, who visited the cave before 1847, stated that there were sculpture fragments scattered in the cave in a style that reminded him of early style. He wrote, "there must have been a very handsome temple here of early date".

See also
Lakulisa Mathura Pillar Inscription
Gopika Cave Inscription
Vasu Doorjamb Inscription

Notes

References

Bibliography

External links
Vadathika Cave Inscription, Siddham, United Kingdom

Indian inscriptions
Archaeological sites in Bihar